Eugenio Hilario Calvo (born 6 May 1909 in Tolosa, dead 20 March 1944) was a Spanish professional association football player. 

Eugenio played his career as a forward and spent most of his career at Real Madrid C.F.. He scored 32 goals in 57 matches in La Liga, and 9 goals in 32 matches in Copa del Rey.

References

 
 madridista.hu
 

Spanish footballers
Real Madrid CF players
1909 births
1944 deaths
Association football forwards